Thaddeus of Naples was an Italian author who wrote the History of the Desolation and Treading Down of the City of Acre and of the Whole Holy Land, an account of the fall of Acre in May 1291.

Thaddeus was probably born around the middle of the 13th century. He was a citizen of Naples and a magister (teacher). He was highly educated and wrote in a rhetorical style in eloquent but difficult Latin. He displays his wide reading by quoting from Augustine, Boethius, Horace, Jerome, Orosius and Statius. He wrote his History in Messina in December 1291. He claimed to have lived in Outremer for several years, although he was not present at the siege of Acre. His date of death is unknown. Paul Riant suggested that Thaddeus was the same person as the Thaddeus who was the bishop of Caffa from 1324, but this hypothesis is extremely unlikely.

The History is written in the form of a letter addressed to all of Christendom. It is based on eyewitness accounts. Thaddeus expresses admiration for the Templars, Hospitallers and Teutonic Knights. He is critical of the city's inhabitants, accusing them of disunity. He is especially critical of the merchant class, singling out the Pisans and Venetians for special opprobrium and accusing them of collaboration with the enemy. Ultimately, he blames the fall of Acre on the sins of Christendom. His favoured passages from the Bible are in Jeremiah and Isaiah. His favourite medieval author was Joachim of Fiore, whose prophetic ideas were influential in the Kingdom of Naples.

Structurally, the History is divided into four parts. The first is a prologue (lines 1–46). The second is a description of the siege (47–772). It is followed by a prophetic interpretation of events, including a planctus and prayers for the fallen city (773–1527). The final section is an exhortation to conquer Jerusalem addressed to the pope and all Christian sovereigns (1528–1610).

The History is preserved complete in five manuscripts and partially in a sixth. All date to the 14th and 15th centuries and all were copied in France or Spain. The best copy, which served as the base text for the most recent critical edition, is London, British Library, Add. MS 22800, copied in northern France.

Editions

Notes

Bibliography

 

13th-century Neapolitan people
Writers from Naples
Italian expatriates in the Crusader states
Historians of the Crusades